Bembecinus quinquespinosus is a species of sand wasp in the family Crabronidae. It is found in the Caribbean Sea, Central America, North America, and South America.

References

External links

 

Crabronidae
Articles created by Qbugbot
Insects described in 1823